Association Solidarité Féminine (ASF) is a non-profit organization founded by Aïcha Chenna in Casablanca, Morocco in 1985. The association helps single mothers gain work experience by training them at the association's restaurant, patisserie, and hammam.

History 
In 1985, ASF was created in Casablanca, Morocco.

In 1988, the association's first center opened its doors in Tizi Ouasli.

See also 
 Education portal
 Morocco portal
 Amal Women's Training Center and Moroccan Restaurant
 Feminization of poverty in Morocco
 Women in Morocco
 List of women's organizations

References

External links 
 Official website of Association Solidarité Féminine

1985 establishments in Morocco
Educational institutions established in 1985
Restaurants established in 1985
Non-profit organizations based in Morocco
Restaurants in Morocco
Women's organizations based in Morocco
Women's occupational organizations
Women and education in Africa
20th-century architecture in Morocco